Otter Creek is a stream in Cooper and Morgan Counties in the U.S. state of Missouri. It is a tributary of the Lamine River.

Otter Creek was so named for the fact it was a hunting ground for otters by pioneers.

See also
List of rivers of Missouri

References

Rivers of Cooper County, Missouri
Rivers of Morgan County, Missouri
Rivers of Missouri